A fire support base (FSB, firebase or FB) is a temporary military facility used to provide fire support (often in the form of artillery) to infantry operating in areas beyond the normal range of fire support from their own base camps. FSBs follow a number of plans, their shape and construction varying based on the terrain they occupy and the projected garrison.

Widely used during the Vietnam War, the concept continues to be used in military operations. Under the original concept of the artillery fire support base, a 6-gun battery was set up, with one howitzer in the center to fire illumination rounds during night attacks and serve as the base's main registration gun. The other five howitzers were arranged around it in a "star" pattern. Smaller FSBs tended to vary greatly from this layout, with two to four howitzers of various calibers (usually 105 mm and 155 mm at battalion level) located in dispersed and fortified firing positions. These smaller bases arranged their guns in square or triangle patterns when possible.

Vietnam War

One of the first fire support bases constructed by U.S. troops was built in October 1965. Designated Bill, it was built by the First Cavalry Division in Pleiku Province soon after the division arrived in South Vietnam. Based on the original concept developed by that division, firebases would move about every two days, minimizing the amount of security and semi-permanent construction they would need. Over time this changed, and firebases evolved into small forts with all the defensive measures those required.

Many fire support bases evolved into more permanent bases. Their main components varied by size: a typical FSB usually had a battery of six 105 millimeter or 155 mm howitzers, a platoon of engineers permanently on station for construction and maintenance projects, at least two landing pads for helicopters (a smaller VIP pad and at least one resupply pad), a Tactical Operations Center (TOC), an aid station staffed with medics, a communications bunker, and a company of infantry serving as the defense garrison. Large FSBs might also have 2 artillery batteries, and an infantry battalion.

Firebase Bastogne was a United States firebase constructed in Vietnam in 1968 by the 101st Airborne Division. Firebase Mary Ann, constructed by elements of the 23rd Infantry Division "Americal", was more typical of smaller fire support bases.

Use in Afghanistan

Firebases had been set up in Afghanistan since the action by U.S.-led Coalition forces began in 2001. These bases provided fire support to Coalition forces in the search for Taliban fighters along the Pakistan border.

Kunar Province
Firebase Phoenix
Helmand Province
Firebase Fiddler's Green
Nangarhar Province
A former firebase - Forward Operating Base Torkham
 Firebase Thomas
 Firebase Tinsley  near Char Chiehna. Formerly FOB Cobra.

See also
 Forward operating base
 Hedgehog defense

References

Citations

Bibliography

External links

The Gunpit - Basic Layout
The 2001 version of Vietnam LZs, FBs, FSBs and Camps
Vietnam Studies: Field Artillery 1954-1973 - Chapter 3 deals with the FSB concept from the field artillery viewpoint

 
Fortifications by type